Macho Man may refer to:
Randy Savage (1952–2011), an American professional wrestler known by the epithet "Macho Man"
Macho Man (album), a 1978 album by the Village People
"Macho Man" (song), a song from the album
Mucho Macho Man, an American racehorse, so called in tribute to the song by Village People
Super Macho Man, a character in the Punch-Out!! video game series

See also
Macho
Machismo